Michael G. Rubin (born July 21, 1972) is an American businessman and philanthropist. He is the CEO of Fanatics, the world's leading provider of licensed sports merchandise; and executive chairman Rue Gilt Groupe, the premier off-price e-commerce portfolio company, which includes RueLaLa.com, Gilt.com, and ShopPremiumOutlets.com. He previously founded GSI Commerce in 1998, selling it to eBay in 2011 for $2.4 billion.

Rubin started the viral “All In Challenge”, where celebrities, influencers and brands donated valuable possessions or once-in-a lifetime experiences to raise $60 million to fight food insecurity during the COVID-19 pandemic.

Rubin was a partner of the Philadelphia 76ers basketball team from 2011 and the New Jersey Devils hockey team from 2013 before selling his ownership stakes in both franchises in June 2022. In an interview with Fox Sports, Rubin attributed the sale to his focus on the expansion of his Fanatics business.

He is also the co-chair of the REFORM Alliance, a criminal justice reform organization that he launched in January 2019, together with Jay-Z, Meek Mill, Robert Kraft, Robert F. Smith, Clara Wu Tsai, Daniel S. Loeb, Michael Novogratz and Laura Arnold.

Rubin has been included in the Forbes 400: The Richest People in America, the Forbes: The World's Billionaires list, and the Bloomberg Billionaires Index. His personal wealth, as of November 2022, was valued at $10.2 billion.

Early life and education
Rubin was born to a Jewish family, the son of Paulette and Ken Rubin. His mother was a psychiatrist and his father was a veterinarian. He grew up in Lafayette Hill, Pennsylvania where he started a ski-tuning shop in his parents' basement when he was 12 and two years later, using $2,500 in bar mitzvah gifts as seed capital and a lease signed by his father, he opened a formal ski shop in Conshohocken, Pennsylvania named Mike's Ski and Sport.

By the age of 16, he was some $120,000 in debt and was able to settle with his creditors using a $37,000 loan from his father under the condition he attend college. Rubin agreed, continuing to operate the business, which grew to five ski shops before he entered college. He attended Villanova University for a semester before dropping out after realizing a large gain on an opportunistic transaction. This involved buying $200,000 in overstock equipment at a deep discount with $17,000 borrowed from a friend and re-selling it for $75,000.

Career
Using the proceeds from his serendipitous overstock transaction and after selling his ski shops, he went on to found the athletic equipment closeout company KPR sports—named after his parents' initials—which bought and sold over-stock name brand merchandise. In 1993, the year Rubin turned 21, KPR reached $1 million in annual sales; by 1995, KPR reached $50 million in sales. In 1995, Rubin purchased 40% of the women's athletic shoe manufacturer Rykä.

In 1998, Rubin created an apparel and logistics company, Global Sports Incorporated, which would later turn into GSI Commerce, a multibillion-dollar e-commerce company. At 38, in 2011, Rubin sold GSI to eBay for $2.4 billion reaping a $150 million windfall. As eBay just wanted  the order fulfillment business for large retailers so it could better compete with Amazon.com, Rubin was able to buy back the consumer businesses of GSI at a fire sale price. He repurchased: Fanatics, Inc., a licensed sports merchandiser; Rue La La, a flash seller, and Shop Runner, a retail benefits program. Rubin serves as CEO of Fanatics and as executive chairman on Rue La La's board. In 2019, it was announced on CNBC that Simon Property Group would team up with Rubin to take their mall inventory online and contribute $280 million to the venture. In December 2020, ShopRunner was sold to FedEx.

Rubin has orchestrated partnership deals for Fanatics with more than 300 professional leagues, sports and teams, including deals with Nike, the National Football League and Major League Baseball that granted Fanatics the rights to design, manufacture and distribute all Nike fan gear for both leagues. At the onset of the COVID-19 pandemic in early 2020, Rubin shut down a Fanatics' MLB uniform manufacturing plant to generate hospital gowns and PPE for frontline workers. In August 2020, he secured $350 million Series E funding for Fanatics that raised the valuation of the company to $6.2 billion.

In March 2021, Rubin and Fanatics secured a $320 million funding round, followed by another $325 million in August 2021 that brought the company's valuation to $18 billion as of September 2021. During the latter funding round, it was announced that Rubin would transition to the role of CEO of a new, larger Fanatics company that would expand beyond merchandising into new sports verticals in order to create a global digital sports platform. It was reported that these verticals may include NFTs, a space Rubin entered in May 2021 by co-founding digital collectibles company Candy Digital; sports betting and gaming; trading cards, ticketing and media.

Philadelphia 76ers and NJ Devils ownership
In October 2011, Rubin bought a minority share in the Philadelphia 76ers. Rubin is a member of the investment group that won a $280 million bid for the team. The other members of the investment group include Joshua Harris of the private equity firm Apollo Global Management, portfolio manager Art Wrubel, former Sacramento Kings executive Jason Levien, former Vail Resorts CEO Adam Aron, Martin J. Geller, David B. Heller, Travis Hennings, James Lassiter, David S. Blitzer, Will Smith & Jada Pinkett Smith, and Indonesian businessmen Handy Soetedjo & Erick Thohir. Comcast-Spectacor began talks with the investment group in the summer of 2011.  The deal was announced on July 13, 2011.  The NBA formally approved the deal on October 13, 2011.

Two years later, as a member of the same investment group, Rubin bought a share in the New Jersey Devils hockey team and management of the Prudential Center for $320 million. The deal was approved by the NHL and announced August 15, 2013.

In June 2022, Rubin sold his stakes in both franchises due to anticipated conflicts between his role as CEO of the growing Fanatics business and the rules of sports team ownership.

Media appearances
In addition to appearing in Forbes, Rubin has been interviewed or quoted in The Wall Street Journal, The New York Times, Fortune, Entrepreneur, People Magazine, and Sports Illustrated.

Rubin has also been featured on Dateline NBC, Good Morning America and CNN.

In 2010, he appeared in the premiere season of the CBS television show Undercover Boss, where he worked undercover in GSI Commerce's warehouse and call center. Once his identity was revealed at the end of the show, he gave an employee, who had recently struggled with the death of a baby, $10,000 so he and the baby's mother could have a dream wedding.

Rubin has been a featured speaker and panelist at e-commerce and sports industry events including the MIT Sloan Sports Analytics Conferences, the Wharton Sports Business Summit, Recode's Code Commerce, and the Fast Company Innovation Festival.

Accolades
Rubin was honored by the Network for Teaching Entrepreneurship (NFTE) at its Philadelphia Visionary Gala in 2011 for representing "the true spirit and determination of an entrepreneur" and serving as an inspiration to NFTE students.

In 2011, Forbes named him one of the year's "20 Most Powerful CEOs 40 and Under."

In 2018 Rubin was named to the inaugural Bleacher Report "Power 50" list of most influential people in sports. Rubin was included in Sports Business Journal's "Top 50 Most Influential People in Sports Business" every year between 2015 and 2019.

Additionally, in 2021, Rubin was named Sports Business Journal's "Most Influential Person in Sports Business" and in 2022 was named their "Sports Executive of the Year."

Personal life
An avid sports fan since his youth, Rubin splits his time between the Philadelphia area, near where he grew up, and New York City, where in 2018 it was reported that he purchased a $43.5 million penthouse.

Rubin is divorced from local dance teacher Meegan Rubin. They have one daughter named Kylie. Rubin had a second daughter, Romi Rubin, in July 2020 with professional model, Camille Fishel. He formerly dated CNN news anchor, Nicole Lapin.

Rubin is close personal friends with rapper Meek Mill, advocating for his release from jail in 2018.

References

External links 
 Corporate Bio from Kynetic

1972 births
Living people
American billionaires
American computer businesspeople
20th-century American Jews
American retail chief executives
Place of birth missing (living people)
American technology chief executives
American technology company founders
Businesspeople from Pennsylvania
Businesspeople in online retailing
New Jersey Devils executives
Philadelphia 76ers owners
Jewish American sportspeople
21st-century American Jews